Springville is an unincorporated community in Perry Township, Lawrence County, Indiana.

History
Springville was platted in 1832. It was named after Spring Creek.

Geography

References

Unincorporated communities in Lawrence County, Indiana
Unincorporated communities in Indiana